The ascending palatine artery is an artery in the head that branches off the facial artery and runs up the superior pharyngeal constrictor muscle.

Structure
The ascending palatine artery arises close to the origin of the facial artery and passes up between the styloglossus and stylopharyngeus to the side of the pharynx along which it is continued between the superior pharyngeal constrictor and the medial pterygoid muscle to near the base of the skull.

It divides near the levator veli palatini muscle into two branches: one supplies and follows the course of this muscle, and, winding over the upper border of the superior pharyngeal constrictor, supplies the soft palate and the palatine glands, anastomosing with its fellow of the opposite side and with the descending palatine branch of the maxillary artery; the other pierces the superior pharyngeal constrictor and supplies the palatine tonsil and auditory tube, anastomosing with the tonsillar branch of the facial artery and the ascending pharyngeal artery.

See also
 Descending palatine artery

References

External links
  - "Muscles in the Lateral Wall of the Pharynx"

Arteries of the head and neck